Associated British Ports owns and operates 21 ports in the United Kingdom, managing around 25 per cent of the UK's sea-borne trade. The company's activities cover transport, haulage and terminal operations, ship's agency, dredging and marine consultancy.

History

Ports formerly owned by rail and canal companies were nationalised in 1947 by Clement Attlee's post Second World War Labour government. The commission was split in 1962 by the Transport Act 1962; the British Transport Docks Board (BTDB) was formed in 1962 as a government-owned body to manage various ports throughout Great Britain.

In 1981 the Conservative government of Margaret Thatcher implemented the Transport Act 1981, which provided for the BTDB's privatisation. Because of BTDB's statutory powers as a harbour operator, a straightforward conversion to limited company status was impractical. Instead, BTDB was renamed as Associated British Ports (ABP) and a limited company, Associated British Ports Holdings Ltd. (ABPH), was created, with the same powers in law over ABP as a holding company has over a subsidiary.

In 1983 the British Government allowed the company to become a public limited company quoted on the London Stock Exchange. The company was taken over by a consortium of companies in 2006 and, in August of that year, the company was de-listed from the London Stock Exchange.

In 2002 ABP bought Hams Hall Distribution Park in the West Midlands from E.ON.

In 2006 a consortium led by Goldman Sachs offered £2.795 billion for the company. 

From 2006 until 2015, the company was owned by a consortium consisting of GS Infrastructure Partners, Borealis Infrastructure, GIC, and Prudential. In March 2015, Anchorage Ports LLP, an investment consortium led by the Canadian Pension Plan Investment Board and Hermes Infrastructure, acquired a 33.3% interest in the business. In addition the Kuwait Investment Authority also purchased a 10% interest in the company.

As a result of these transactions the shareholdings in the group holding company as of 2015 were: 33.3% owned by Borealis Infrastructure, 33.3% by Anchorage Ports LLP, 23.3% by Cheyne Walk Investment Pte. Ltd (a nominated investment vehicle of GIC) and 10% by the Kuwait Investment Authority.

Ports
ABPH manages the following ports:
Ayr
Port of Barrow
Barry Docks
Fleetwood
Port of Garston
Goole
Port of Grimsby
Hams Hall
Port of Hull
Port of Immingham
Port of Ipswich
King's Lynn
Port of Lowestoft
Newport Docks
Plymouth
Port of Port Talbot
Silloth
Port of Southampton
Port of Swansea
Teignmouth
Troon

Other port operators in the UK include:
Peel Ports (operate Mersey Docks and Harbour Company and Port Salford)
Peninsular and Oriental group (aka P&O Group)
PD Ports
Forth Ports

References

External links

 Associated British Port Holdings Ltd

Companies formerly listed on the London Stock Exchange
Former nationalised industries of the United Kingdom
Transport operators of the United Kingdom
Port operating companies
OMERS companies
British companies established in 1981
Holding companies of the United Kingdom
CPP Investment Board companies